Malcolm Stanley Healey (born June 1944) is a British entrepreneur.

Career
Healey began his career in his family's paint company.

In 1982 MFI Group and Healey's company, Humber Kitchens, bought Hygena a kitchen and furniture retail company, from Norcros who were looking to dissolve the company and sell the Hygena name. MFI took full control of Hygena in 1987, buying Healey out for £200 million.

In 2009, he founded Wren Living, now known as Wren Kitchens, a kitchen manufacturing and retail company which as of the beginning of 2019 had 82 showrooms across the UK, with an annual turnover in 2018 of £490 million.

As of 2020, Healey's West Retail Group also owned the online electronics retailer Ebuyer.

In 2019, Healey donated £250,000 to the Conservative Party two weeks after its leader Boris Johnson became Prime Minister. He has donated £2,210,000 to the Conservative Party since 2017.

Personal life
Healey owns Warter Priory, a 12,000-acre estate near Pocklington.

Malcolm Healey had three children. 
His daughter, Suzy, was found strangled at her country home in August 2005. Richard Holtby, her ex-fiancé, was convicted of manslaughter and sentenced to eight and a half years in prison by a jury at Kingston upon Hull Crown Court in June 2006.

References

1944 births
Living people
Businesspeople from Kingston upon Hull
British billionaires
Conservative Party (UK) donors